Mildrixia constitutionella is a species of snout moth, and the only species in the genus Mildrixia. The species and genus were described by Harrison Gray Dyar Jr. in 1914. It is found in Mexico.

References

Moths described in 1914
Phycitinae